Kalundborg Radio is a major transmission facility for long- and mediumwave at the harbour of Kalundborg in Denmark.

History 
The transmitter site was inaugurated on 27 August 1927 and started broadcasting the first channel of Danish radio on 243 kHz longwave with 300 kW. On 1 October 1951, mediumwave broadcasts of DR P2 commenced on 1062 kHz mediumwave with 250 kW. Besides these two transmitters, there is also a common reserve transmitter.

On 15 February 2007 at 00:05, longwave transmissions from Kalundborg were suspended after 80 years of service. Longwave transmissions were resumed in DRM (Digital Radio Mondiale) at reduced power (0.2 kilowatts) on 3 October 2008 after substantial modifications to the aerial earlier that year. Until mid-June 2011, broadcasts continued to be transmitted with a restricted time schedule on mediumwave band (1062 kHz or 282 meters wavelength) with 250 kilowatts. After that, the mediumwave transmitter was taken out of service and replaced by a new longwave transmitter with 50 kilowatts of power. From 6 to 12 September 2012, the transmitter broadcast BBC programmes with 10 kW of power in DRM mode outside DR's broadcast blocks in connection with the international broadcasting exhibition IBC 2012 in Amsterdam.

Every year on 4 May, Danmarks Radio symbolically broadcasts the message of freedom from the Kalundborg transmitter in an hour-long memorial broadcast that begins after the news at 20:00. The historic message is rebroadcast from DR P5.

It is possible to receive the longwave signal of the Kalundborg transmitter outdoors over a distance of 800-1,000 km on a standard transistor radio or a longwave-compatible car radio. By connecting the receiver to a stationary or a maritime wire, frame or active antenna, the reception improves up to 1,500 km of range.

The old long- and mediumwave reserve transmitter is known to have replaced the mediumwave and DRM transmitters on longwave from 16 to 31 October 2009. The antenna tower for mediumwave is still standing. The longwave frequency of 243 kHz is still on air as of 2022.

Features 
For the longwave transmitter an Alexanderson aerial is used, with two grounded 118 m steel lattice radiating towers connected by top capacitance wires. The northern tower is fed from the transmitter through a top coil, with the top coil of the southern slave tower being fed via the capacitance wires. The medium wave transmitter uses an insulated guyed steel lattice mast aerial with a height of 147 metres. All masts virtually stand in the sea on the narrow Gisseløre peninsula, which allows for excellent radiation efficiency.

Daily programming schedule in CET (special programming not included) 

05.45: Shipping Forecast produced by the Danish Meteorological Institute (Danmarks Meteorologiske Institut)
06.00: News (Radioavisen), rebroadcast from DR P4 København
08.00: News (Radioavisen), rebroadcast from DR P4 København (Not broadcast on Sundays and public holidays)
08.05: Act of worship - Morning Devotion (Morgenandagt) from the Church of Our Lady in Copenhagen produced by DR P2 (Not broadcast on Sundays)
08.30: Morning gymnastics - Body and Movement (Krop og bevægelse) produced by DR P5
08.45: Shipping Forecast produced by the Danish Meteorological Institute (Danmarks Meteorologiske Institut)
09.00: News (Radioavisen), rebroadcast from DR P4 København
11.45: Shipping Forecast produced by the Danish Meteorological Institute (Danmarks Meteorologiske Institut)
12.00: News (Radioavisen), rebroadcast from DR P4 København
17.45: Shipping Forecast produced by the Danish Meteorological Institute (Danmarks Meteorologiske Institut)
18.00: News (Radioavisen), rebroadcast from DR P4 København
18.05: Fairway Information (Farvandsefterretninger)

Photo gallery

See also
List of towers
List of masts

References

External links
 How to receive DRM from Kalundborg
 
 
http://www.skyscraperpage.com/diagrams/?b45594
http://www.skyscraperpage.com/diagrams/?b45595
http://www.skyscraperpage.com/diagrams/?b45596

Towers in Denmark
Mass media in Denmark
Buildings and structures in Kalundborg Municipality
Longwave radio stations
Transmitter